Siro Bianchi (23 August 1924 – 16 June 1992) was a French racing cyclist. He rode in the 1952 Tour de France. Italian by birth, he was naturalized French on 3 July 1953.

References

1924 births
1992 deaths
French male cyclists
Place of birth missing
Italian emigrants to France